Munda Pind village situated on edge of Sutlej river in Tarn Taran Sahib District of Punjab, India.According to 2001 census of India  The Village has the population of 4,526 and 782 houses.

Education 

Government primary school
Government high school
Baba amar singh model school
Baba Deep Singh public school (Dehra sahib) 
Sri guru hargobind sahib sen sec school jamarai
Lotus valley sen. Sec. school tur
Shah harbans school rani walah
Baba bir singh public school bhail

Villages in Tarn Taran district